Schmöckwitz is a German locality (Ortsteil) within the Berlin borough (Bezirk) of Treptow-Köpenick. Until 2001 it was part of the former borough of Köpenick.

History
The locality was founded in 1375 with the name of Smekewitz. In 1920 it merged into the city of Berlin with the "Greater Berlin Act" and from 1949 to 1990 it was part of East Berlin

Geography

Overview
The bordering localities within Berlin are Müggelheim and Grünau.

Subdivision
Schmöckwitz counts 4 zones (Ortslagen):

Transport
The locality is crossed by the south-eastern branch of S-Bahn rail, by the lines S46 and S8, with the nearest station at Eichwalde, in Brandenburg. It is also served by the tram line 68, which ends in the middle of the village and passes through Karolinenhof. The bus lines serving the quarter are the 168 and 733.

Photogallery

References

External links

 Schmöckwitz page on www.berlin.de

Localities of Berlin

Populated places established in the 1370s